The men's team sabre was one of seven fencing events on the fencing at the 1948 Summer Olympics programme. It was the eighth appearance of the event. The competition was held from 10 August 1948 to 11 August 1948. 85 fencers from 17 nations competed.

The competition format continued the pool play round-robin from prior years. Each of the four fencers from one team would face each of the four from the other, for a total of 16 bouts per match. The team that won more bouts won the match, with competition potentially stopping when one team reached 9 points out of the possible 16 (this did not always occur and matches sometimes continued). If the bouts were 8–8, touches received was used to determine the winning team. Pool matches unnecessary to the result were not played.

Rosters

Argentina
 Manuel Agüero
 José D'Andrea
 Edgardo Pomini
 Jorge Cermesoni
 Fernando Huergo
 Daniel Sande

Austria
 Werner Plattner
 Heinz Putzl
 Heinz Lechner
 Hubert Loisel

Belgium
 Robert Bayot
 Georges de Bourguignon
 Ferdinand Jassogne
 Eugène Laermans
 Marcel Nys
 Édouard Yves

Canada
 Robert Desjarlais
 Alf Horn
 Roland Asselin
 Georges Pouliot

Czechoslovakia
 Jindřich Kakos
 Svatopluk Skýva
 Jaroslav Starý
 Alois Sokol
 Jindřich Chmela

Egypt
 Salah Dessouki
 Mohamed Zulficar
 Mahmoud Younes
 Ahmed Abou-Shadi

France
 Jean-François Tournon
 Jean Parent
 Maurice Gramain
 Jacques Lefèvre
 Jean Levavasseur
 Georges Lévêcque

Great Britain
 Arthur Pilbrow
 George Moore
 Emrys Lloyd
 Roger Tredgold
 Robin Brook

Greece
 Nikolaos Khristogiannopoulos
 Athanasios Nanopoulos
 Ioannis Karamazakis
 Andreas Skotidas

Hungary
 Aladár Gerevich
 Tibor Berczelly
 Rudolf Kárpáti
 Pál Kovács
 László Rajcsányi
 Bertalan Papp

Italy
 Vincenzo Pinton
 Gastone Darè
 Carlo Turcato
 Mauro Racca
 Aldo Montano
 Renzo Nostini

Mexico
 Benito Ramos
 Francisco Valero
 Antonio Haro
 Fidel Luña

Netherlands
 Henny ter Weer
 Antoon Hoevers
 Willem van den Berg
 Frans Mosman
 Eddy Kuijpers

Poland
 Antoni Sobik
 Bolesław Banaś
 Teodor Zaczyk
 Jerzy Wójcik
 Jan Nawrocki

Switzerland
 Roland Turian
 Alphonse Ruckstuhl
 Otto Greter
 Walter Widemann

Turkey
 Merih Sezen
 Nihat Balkan
 Rıza Arseven
 Sabri Tezcan
 Vural Balcan

United States
 Norman Cohn-Armitage
 George Worth
 Tibor Nyilas
 Dean Cetrulo
 Miguel de Capriles
 James Flynn

Results

Round 1

The top two teams in each pool advanced to round 2.

Pool 1

Egypt (13–3) and Czechoslovakia (9–2) each defeated Mexico.

Pool 2

Austria (14–2) and France (9–1) each defeated Switzerland.

Pool 3

Poland (11–5) and Belgium (9–2) each defeated Turkey.

Pool 4

The Netherlands (13–3) and Italy (9–1) each defeated Canada.

Pool 5

The United States (14–2) and Argentina (9–1) each defeated Greece.

Pool 6

Denmark withdrew, leaving Great Britain and Hungary to advance unopposed.

Round 2

The top two teams in each pool advanced to the semifinals.

Pool 1

Belgium (13–3) and Hungary (9–3) each defeated Egypt.

Pool 2

The United States (11–5) and Italy (9–4) each defeated Great Britain.

Pool 3

Argentina beat the Netherlands 9–7, the Netherlands beat Czechoslovakia 10–6, and Argentina defeated Czechoslovakia 9–7.

Pool 4

France (10–6) and Poland (8–8, 55–59 touches against) each defeated Austria.

Semifinals

The top two teams in each pool advanced to the final.

Semifinal 1

Hungary beat Argentina 15–1, Belgium defeated Poland 9–7, Belgium defeated Argentina 9–4, and Hungary beat Poland 12–3.

Semifinal 2

Italy beat the Netherlands 13–3, the United States defeated France 11–5, the United States defeated the Netherlands 9–2, and Italy beat France 9–5.

Final

In the first pairings, Italy defeated Belgium and Hungary beat the United States, each by a score of 10–6. Hungary (9–1 over Belgium) and Italy (8–8 over the United States, prevailing by touches received 59–61) won again in the second set of matches as well. The United States beat Belgium 10–5 in a de facto bronze medal match, while Hungary prevailed 10–6 over Italy for the gold medal.

References

Sabre team
Men's events at the 1948 Summer Olympics